The 1983–84 Scottish League Cup was the thirty-eighth season of Scotland's second football knockout competition. The competition was won by Rangers, who defeated Celtic in the Final.

First round

First Leg

Second Leg

Second round

First Leg

Second Leg

Third round

Group 1

Group 2

Group 3

Group 4

Semi-finals

First Leg

Second Leg

Final

References

General

Specific

Scottish League Cup
Scottish League Cup seasons